Ribemont is a commune in the Aisne department in Hauts-de-France in northern France. It is the birthplace of Marquis de Condorcet (1743-1794), figure of the French Revolution

History 
Two treaties were signed in Ribemont:
The Treaty of Ribemont in 880 was the last treaty on the partitions of the Frankish Empire. It was signed by the German king Louis the Younger and the kings of Western Francia, Louis III and Carloman.
 The Treaty of Ribemont in 1179 was signed on 2 May 1179 by the two eldest sons of the late Duke Matthias I of Lorraine.

Population

See also
 Communes of the Aisne department
 List of medieval bridges in France

References

Communes of Aisne
Aisne communes articles needing translation from French Wikipedia